Coleophora trichopterella is a moth of the family Coleophoridae. It is found in Spain.

References

trichopterella
Moths of Europe
Moths described in 1985